South Platte River Bridges (also known as the Bronco Arch Bridge) were a pair of historic arch bridges that carried Denver's Valley Highway, since designated Interstate 25, over the South Platte River.  Between May 2011 and August 2013, these bridges were replaced due to deterioration of the structures.

References

External links

South Platte River Bridge, Denver, Colorado on Flickr

Transportation buildings and structures in Denver
National Register of Historic Places in Denver
Road bridges on the National Register of Historic Places in Colorado
Interstate 25
Demolished bridges in the United States
Rebuilt buildings and structures in the United States
Open-spandrel deck arch bridges in the United States
Girder bridges in the United States
Bridges on the Interstate Highway System
Bridges completed in 1951
Buildings and structures demolished in 2012